Mystery Science Theater 3000 (MST3K) is an American television comedy series created by Joel Hodgson and produced by Best Brains, Inc. The show premiered on KTMA (now WUCW) in Minneapolis, Minnesota, on November 24, 1988. The next year, in 1989, the show began its national run on The Comedy Channel/Comedy Central, running for seven seasons on that channel until its cancellation in 1996. The following year, it was picked up by The Sci-Fi Channel and aired for three more seasons there until another cancellation in August 1999 (although repeats continued until 2004). A sixty-episode syndication package titled The Mystery Science Theater Hour was produced in 1995.

In 2015, Hodgson led a crowdfunded revival of the series with 14 episodes in its eleventh season which was released on Netflix.  A feature film, titled Mystery Science Theater 3000: The Movie, was also released on April 19, 1996.

Series overview

Episodes
Episodes are listed in production number order, not production order or air date order. The episode title is next, and if the original film title is different from the episode title, it follows in parentheses. If the episode features any shorts, they are listed below. In the third column is the film's initial release year, a color/black & white notation, the production company (if known), and the country of origin. The last column shows the initial air date of the episode. Below this is a brief synopsis of the featured movie and shorts, with major cast, character, and production changes noted in italic.

KTMA-TV (1988–89)

Season 1 (1989–90) 
{{Episode table |background=#FECE0C |overall=5 |season=5 |title=35 |aux3=40 |airdate=15 |titleT=Film |aux3T=Film details |episodes=
{{Episode list
 | EpisodeNumber   = 22
 | EpisodeNumber2  = 1
 | RTitle          = The Crawling Eye(The Trollenberg Terror)
 | Aux3            = 1958, B&W, DCA/Wade Williams, UK
 | OriginalAirDate = 
 | ShortSummary    = A man discovers that an extraterrestrial force is killing mountain climbers in a small village.First episode for The Comedy Channel. Jim Mallon's first appearance as Gypsy.
 | LineColor       = FECE0C
}}

}}

 Season 2 (1990–91) 

 Season 3 (1991–92) 

 Season 4 (1992–93) 

 Season 5 (1993–94) 

 Season 6 (1994–95) 

 Season 7 (1995–96) 

 Mystery Science Theater 3000: The Movie (1996) 

Season 8 (1997)

Season 9 (1998)

Season 10 (1999)

 Season 11 (2017) 
The fan-funded eleventh season of the series is listed by Netflix as Mystery Science Theater 3000: The Return.

 Season 12 (2018) 
The twelfth season, consisting of six episodes, was released on Netflix on November 22, 2018. The season is presented as Mystery Science Theater 3000: The Gauntlet.

 Season 13 (2022)Demon Squad and Robot Wars were announced early as the first two films to be featured in Season 13; H. G. Wells' The Shape of Things to Come, The Batwoman, Santo in the Treasure of Dracula, Doctor Mordrid, Gamera vs. Jiger, Munchie, The Bubble, The Mask 3D, The Christmas Dragon, Beyond Atlantis and The Million Eyes of Sumuru were announced during the Turkey Day Marathon on November 25, 2021, Million Eyes having appeared over thirty years prior in the original KTMA season (albeit in an edited-for-content version) and is also featured as a video on demand from spiritual successor RiffTrax. Episodes are expected to roll out monthly throughout 2022, starting on March 4, culminating in The Christmas Dragon as a Christmas special and season finale. Santo, Robot Wars, and Beyond Atlantis'' were shown in pre-release form as tests of the Gizmoplex to backers on the dates shown below, then were shown in their full form from May 6 to May 8, 2022.

See also
 List of Mystery Science Theater 3000 home video releases
 The Film Crew
 RiffTrax
 Cinematic Titanic

Notes
1. Episode 104 was both the last episode of Season 1 to be produced and to air. Despite this, it was given the lower production number.
2. Due to issues with the movie rights, Episode 1003 debuted a month after the series finale first aired.

References

External links
 Episode list for "Mystery Science Theater 3000" on Internet Movie Database
 Episode list for "Mystery Science Theater 3000: The Return" on Internet Movie Database

Mystery Science Theater 3000
Mystery Science Theater 3000
Works about films